The Maritime Safety & Security Information System (MSSIS) is a freely-shared, unclassified, near real-time data collection and distribution network. Its member countries share data from Automatic Identification System (AIS), coastal radar, and other maritime-related systems.  MSSIS combines the data from participating nations into a single data stream through secure Internet-based servers. Through MSSIS, participating governments can view real-time AIS data from around the world in a wide range of geographic display options, including text, photo overlays, electronic charts, and Google Earth. Displays can also integrate additional features such as user-provided radar overlays.

MSSIS Background

MSSIS was developed by the Volpe National Transportation Systems Center at the U.S. Department of Transportation's Research and Innovative Technology Administration and is available to nations worldwide to improve global maritime safety, security, commerce and environmental stewardship.

Benefits of MSSIS

The global sharing of AIS data among governments through a common, open exchange provides a solid foundation for and a path to greater international trust, cooperation and open dialog and thus, improved stability, security, trade, and environmental stewardship.

MSSIS provides participating nations unprecedented access to global shipping information. Specific benefits of sharing AIS data via MSSIS include:

 Feeding data to existing in-country maritime awareness systems & initiatives
 Building regional Vessel Traffic Services (VTS) capabilities
 Allowing the development of vessel safety statistics & analysis of vessel transits
 Serving as the underlying feed for layering complementary data (radar pictures, oil spill monitoring, port operations etc.)

MSSIS already serves as the data feed for many sophisticated applications benefiting seafarers and citizens of nations around the world.

MSSIS capabilities

The Volpe Center provides Transview (TV32), a Microsoft Windows-based application,
to access the MSSIS network. Transview provides a means to view MSSIS data and can also serve as interface between the MSSIS network and other Maritime Domain Awareness (MDA) systems a government might already be operating.

Additional capabilities of TV32 include:

 Vessel traffic management (Vessel Traffic Service, situation displays etc.)
 Canal transit management
 Maritime de-confliction
 Safety statistics (via data logging & playback, snapshot files)
 Pilot navigation (ETA, closest point of approach, dead reckoning)
 Accident investigation (via data logging and playback)
 Buoy positioning
 Oil spill modeling display
 Harbor surveillance
 Secure vessel transiting
 Monitoring of territorial waters
 Security zones - dynamic, static, user-defined
 Secure data exchange

MSSIS Security

Because participants view the protection of vessel data from unauthorized use as crucial, MSSIS enables password-protected, Internet-based sharing of AIS data using encrypted data links (TCP/IP SSL Secure Socket Layer).

 No processing, alteration, or storing occurs
 Data is open source and freely shared among participating governments
 Can be used by any system that uses standard format AIS data

Recognition and awards

MSSIS is a winner of the 2008 Innovations in American Government Award from the Ash Institute for Democratic Governance and Innovation at the John F. Kennedy School of Government at Harvard University for its efforts in enhancing levels of safety and economic stability in the global seas.

How Nations Become Participants

By contributing AIS data into MSSIS, a country becomes eligible to receive the AIS data from all nations participating in MSSIS. Technical assistance is available to any country with a willingness to participate. Transview (TV32), the MSSIS client software, is provided free-of-charge by the Volpe Center.

Nations interested in learning more about MSSIS contact the interim MSSIS administrator, the U.S. Office of Global Maritime Situational Awareness, to arrange a visit by a technical assessment team. This team can demonstrate the benefits of MSSIS and discuss participation requirements.

Notes

Resources
 Transview (TV32) Installation and Operations Guide for Maritime Safety and Security Information System (MSSIS). U.S. Department of Transportation Volpe Center, Cambridge, MA, July 10, 2008
 The Office of Global Maritime Situational Awareness Maritime Awareness Wiki entry for MSSIS
 The U.S. DOT Volpe Center MSSIS Web site
 The Office of Global Maritime Situational Awareness official Web site
 The Office of Global Maritime Situational Awareness Maritime Awareness Wiki

Maritime safety